The 1997–98 Championnat National season was the first season of Championnat National in one group.

League table

References

External links 
 Official site

 

Championnat National seasons
3
France